Behram Khan (born 31 December 1987) is a Pakistani first-class cricketer who plays for Karachi Whites.

References

External links
 

1987 births
Living people
Pakistani cricketers
Karachi Whites cricketers
Cricketers from Karachi